"Hi Ho Silver" is a song by Scottish singer/songwriter Jim Diamond. It is best known for being the theme song for the British television series Boon. The song was from Diamond's second solo studio album Desire for Freedom, and it reached No. 5 on the UK chart in 1986.

Although many people believe that Diamond wrote the song especially for Boon, he actually wrote it in memory of his father who had died the previous year.

Background
Diamond was approached by Central Television in 1985 to write and record the theme song for a new television drama series. Diamond at first declined the offer but Central were persistent. He told them to send a script of the pilot episode so he could read it over. The script was headed "Ken Boon - Fireman". This instantly had him intrigued and he felt that he should do it. His father had been a firefighter for many years. The song's lyrics explain how Diamond's father had "rescued" him on many occasions when he was down on his luck and how he regarded his father as The Lone Ranger and his hero.

Charts

References

1986 songs
1986 singles
Jim Diamond (singer) songs
Television drama theme songs
Songs about fathers
Commemoration songs
Songs written by Jim Diamond (singer)
A&M Records singles